Adassa is the self-titled third studio album by Colombian-American reggaeton singer-songwriter Adassa. It was released on April 24, 2007.

Track listing

See also
Reggaeton

References

2007 albums